Shane Pumipi (born 13 April 1990) is a New Zealand professional rugby league footballer. He previously played for the St. George Illawarra Dragons in the National Rugby League.

Background
Born in Dargaville, New Zealand, Pumipi played his junior football for Northland Rugby Union before switching to rugby league and playing for the Northcote Tigers. He was then signed by the Cronulla-Sutherland Sharks. In 2006, Pumipi played for the Junior Kiwis Under-16s team.

Playing career
In 2008 and 2009, Pumipi played for the Cronulla-Sutherland Sharks' NYC team before joining the Canterbury-Bankstown Bulldogs mid-season in 2009 and playing on into 2010.

In 2011, Pumipi played for Bankstown Sports in the Bundaberg Cup before moving on to the Canterbury Bankstown Bulldogs New South Wales Cup team mid-season.

In 2012, Pumipi played for the New South Wales Residents team.

In 2013, Pumipi joined the Illawarra Cutters, the New South Wales Cup team of the St. George Illawarra Dragons, before gaining a contract with the Dragons.

In Round 12 of the 2014 NRL season, Pumipi made his NRL debut for the Dragons against the South Sydney Rabbitohs after his former New South Wales Cup coach from 2013, Paul McGregor was promoted to NRL coach following the sacking of Steve Price.

On 29 October 2014, Pumipi was released from the Dragons.

References

External links
2014 St. George Illawarra Dragons profile

1990 births
Living people
Illawarra Cutters players
New Zealand Māori rugby league players
New Zealand rugby league players
Northcote Tigers players
Rugby league five-eighths
Rugby league hookers
Rugby league players from Dargaville
St. George Illawarra Dragons players